Sword of Gideon is a 1986 Canadian television film about Mossad agents hunting down terrorists associated with the 1972 Munich massacre. It was first shown on the CTV Television Network in Canada as a four-hour miniseries and later on HBO in the United States. Directed by Michael Anderson and written by Chris Bryant, the film stars Steven Bauer and Michael York. The film is based on the book Vengeance by George Jonas, an account of the incident which has been criticized by some intelligence personnel as fictional, though because of its covert nature is difficult to prove or disprove. In some countries the book was titled Vengeance: Sword of Gideon, from which the movie title is drawn. The story was retold in the 2005 film Munich by Steven Spielberg.

Plot
Avner, an adept Israeli military officer, is interrupted from his service in the IDF by a special request from Israeli Prime Minister Golda Meir to join Mossad, Israel's intelligence agency. Despite warnings from his father, he agrees to join, and becomes the leader of an elite five-man group assigned to assassinate all of the Black September terrorists involved in the Munich massacre. Shortly before embarking, however, his wife reveals to him that she is pregnant, to Avner's surprise.

The undercover unit is dispatched to Europe, where most of the terrorists are located, and begin assassinating them via firearms and bombs. Initially, they are very successful, but after Avner witnesses one of their targets' wife and daughter crying in the hospital upon learning of his death, he soon begins to question the morality of his mission.

Eventually, the unit becomes wanted internationally for the assassinations, and spies dispatched by Black September are successful in killing most of Avner's team over the course of several months. After a botched assassination attempt of two targets results in the team almost being wiped out, Avner asks the case officer in charge of the mission to abort, and his request is granted, ending the mission with only two suriviors.

Upon returning to Israel, Avner's case officer reveals that his Mossad contract length is three years, prompting him to angrily attempt to quit his job and move to New York with his wife and infant son. There, he is the target of harassment by his case officer, who attempts to convince him to return to Israel and go on another mission for Mossad. Avner refuses, stating that he only wants to join the IDF and become an officer again. His boss flatly rejects the offer, and withdraws all of Avner's money from his bank account as punishment for violating his contract with Mossad, leaving the family completely broke. However, he purchases and repairs an old apartment, and is able to make a modest living as a taxi cab driver.

As the movie ends, Avner can be seen commanding an IDF armored column through the desert, and a paragraph of text explains that he returned to Israel to command his tank unit during the Yom Kippur War.

Cast
 Steven Bauer as Avner
 Michael York as Robert
 Robert Joy as Hans
 Laurent Malet as Jean
 Peter Dvorsky as Carl
 Rod Steiger as Mordechai Samuels
 Lino Ventura as Papa
 Colleen Dewhurst as Prime Minister Golda Meir
 Leslie Hope as Shoshana
 John Hirsch as Avner's Father
 Cyrielle Clair as Jeanette Von Lesseps
 Linda Griffiths as Carl's Widow
 Daniel Alfie as Ali Salameh
 Hrant Alianak as Wael Zwaiter
 Sonia Benezra as Mrs. Hamshari

Home media
The film was released on VHS by HBO/Cannon Video under license from Home Box Office. However, HBO didn't own it and then in 2004 was released on DVD by Echo Bridge Home Entertainment. Currently, the film belongs to Entertainment One (formerly Alliance Entertainment).

External links
 
 
 

Canadian television films
English-language Canadian films
Munich massacre
Operation Wrath of God
1986 television films
1986 films
Cultural depictions of Golda Meir
Films directed by Michael Anderson
Films based on non-fiction books
1980s Canadian films